Gulwe is a town in Tanzania.

Transport 

Gulwe is a station on the Central Railway of Tanzanian Railways. This will be replaced by a new Standard Gauge Railway with a passenger station and a separate freight station. Both were near to completion in early 2023.
It is the railhead for Mpwapwa.

See also 

 Railway stations in Tanzania

References 

Populated places in Dodoma Region